Better Nature is the fourth studio album by Los Angeles alternative rock band Silversun Pickups. The album was produced by Jacknife Lee, and was released on September 25, 2015. It is the first of the band's albums to be released on their own label, New Machine Records; as well as their first to be supported by a Pledgemusic campaign. The album was announced on July 15, 2015. The lead single for the album, "Nightlight," was released to radio on August 6, 2015. It was accompanied by a music video, directed by Mark Pellington and starring Boardwalk Empire actor Meg Steedle. The album's second single, "Circadian Rhythm (Last Dance)," was premiered via The Daily Beast on September 10, 2015. An accompanying video, directed by Scott Weintrob, was released to YouTube and Vevo the following day.

Track listing 

 The end of "Tapedeck" leads into "Latchkey Kids" (aka the end of "Tapedeck" is a studio session of "Latchkey Kids" that then transitions into "Latchkey Kids")

Vinyl track listing

Reception
Better Nature received mostly positive reviews.

Charts

Personnel

Silversun Pickups

 Brian Aubert – lead vocals, backing vocals, guitars
 Nikki Monninger – bass guitar, backing vocals, lead vocals (6), vibraphone (7)
 Joe Lester – keyboards, synthesizer, sound manipulation, drum machine, sequencer, backing vocals (5)
 Christopher Guanlao – drums, backing vocals (5)

Additional personnel
 Jacknife Lee – additional keyboards, mixing, production, programming
 Alan Moulder – mixing

Tour 

The tour for Better Nature actually started 15 days before the release of the album.

Setlist 

Setlist won't count omissions due to the Sliversun Pickups' weird touring settings. 
 Cradle (Better Nature) (dropped after 22 April 2017)
 Connection (played on 28 September 2015)
 Well Thought Out Twinkles
 Bloody Mary (Nerve Endings) (played on 10, 27, 28, 29 September 2015, 8 December 2015, 6, 9 May 2016, 23 August 2016, added on 23 April 2017, dropped after 4 May 2017)
 Nightlight
 The Royal We
 Circadian Rhythm (Last Dance)
 The Pit
 Pins and Needles (played on 29, 30 September 2015, 25 April 2017)
 Friendly Fires
 Latchkey Kids
 Panic Switch
 Ragamuffin (dropped after 13 June 2017)
 Vasoline (played on 5 December 2015)
 Growing Old Is Getting Old (played on 6 May 2016)
 Rusted Wheel (played on 26 April 2017)
 Lazy Eye
 Little Lover's so Polite [ENCORE]
 Catch and Release (played on 10, 28 September 2015, added on 23 April 2017, dropped after 4 May 2017) [ENCORE]
 Cannibal (played on 10, 27 September 2015, rarely played from December 2015 to April 2017) [ENCORE]
 Substitution (played on 29 September 2015, occasionally played after April 2016) [ENCORE]
 Three Seed (played on 14 April 2016, added on 25 October 2016, dropped after 5 May 2017) [ENCORE]
 Kissing Families (occasionally played) [ENCORE]
 Dots and Dashes (Enough Already) [ENCORE]
 The Wild Kind (added on 27 September 2015, dropped after 5 May 2017) [ENCORE]

References

2015 albums
Silversun Pickups albums
Albums produced by Jacknife Lee